Le Bilan (translation : The Balance Sheet) is a 1980 song of the French singer Jean Ferrat.

In this song, Jean Ferrat remembers communist commitments of his youth and the young people of his generation who, having participated in the social movements of the 1930s, the secret war during World War II and post-war years, have seen their ideals betrayed by the Stalinist Communists and their successors.

He denounces the repeated lies, rigged trials, misinformation, etc., of the Soviet government.

The title of the song derives from words of Georges Marchais on 23 April 1979. According to the leader of the French Communist Party, the balance of the Soviet Union was "generally positive", that denies Jean Ferrat.

See also 
 Stalinism
 Slánský trial

External links 
  Interview of Jean Ferrat, who made a comment about his songs, including this song

Jean Ferrat songs
Songs written by Jean Ferrat
French songs
1980 songs
Political songs